Pike River Coal Ltd was a mining company listed on the New Zealand and Australian stock exchanges. Its primary operation was the Pike River Mine, the site of a mining disaster with 29 deaths on 19 November 2010.

The company first listed and began trading on the New Zealand Exchange on 20 July 2007. On 22 November 2010, trading in the company's shares and options was suspended from the New Zealand Exchange at the company's request, pending developments from the mining disaster. On 12 December 2010 the company was placed in receivership.

Pike River Mine is a coal mine located 46 km east of Greymouth in the West Coast Region of New Zealand's South Island. The operation was set up to mine the Brunner seam, a bituminous coal deposit with lower ash and varying sulphur content.

Company management
Peter W Whittall, a 29-year veteran miner and mining executive, was appointed CEO on 2 October 2010. The Pike River Mine disaster occurred less than two months later. Prior to his role as CEO, Whittall held the position of General Manager Mines and was responsible for on-site construction, mine development and recruitment at the Pike River operation. Whittall became the company spokesperson during the mining disaster.

The previous head of the company was Gordon Ward, who was managing director and CEO from May 2007 until 1 October 2010. Until his departure, Ward had led Pike River Mine from its initial conceptual design for fourteen years.

History
The company raised NZ$85 million in additional capital for expanding the Pike River Mine in 2007. As of August 2007, over NZ$100 million had already been invested into developing the mine. By June 2010, Pike River Coal had invested a total of $288 million in developing the mine. Pike River Coal reported net operating losses of $39 million in the year to June 2010, and $13 million in 2009.

Prior to the mine disaster, Pike River Coal Ltd had a market capitalisation varying around NZD400M. Pike River Coal was initially held by New Zealand Oil & Gas (29% stake plus options and bonds) as well as the two Indian companies; Gujarat NRE Coke Limited, (17% share), and Saurashtra Fuels Private Limited, (15% share), with the two latter companies intending to buy about half the running production of the mine's coal.  After the initial public offering, the percentages changed to NZ Oil and Gas 31%, Gujarat NRE Coke 10%, Saurashtra Fuels 8.5%, private minority shareholders had 7.9% and the remaining 42.5% was sold to the public.

On 12 December 2010, New Zealand Oil & Gas released a statement saying that it had decided to put Pike River Coal into receivership. On 13 December 2010, New Zealand Oil And Gas stated that Pricewaterhouse Coopers had been appointed receivers.

The company was purchased by Solid Energy in 2012, although the government is responsible for investigation and re-entry into the mine.

In July 2013 the company was ordered to pay $110,000 to each of the victims' families and fined $760,000 - but in the end didn't pay the fine and only paid $5000 to each family, saying it didn't have the money. In November 2013 Labour Party leader David Cunliffe said if elected, Labour would ensure the families receive the payouts they were awarded.

See also
Mining in New Zealand
Mining in Australia

References

External links
Pike River Coal Limited
2010 November Shareholder Briefings (pdf) by Peter Whittall, CEO
Pike River Coal Ltd, Activities Report, Quarter ended 30 September 2010
Pike River Coal Ltd, Activities Report, Quarter ended 30 June 2008
NZ Oil & Gas (NZOG) website

Coal companies of New Zealand
Coal mines in New Zealand
Grey District
Underground mines in New Zealand
Companies listed on the New Zealand Exchange
Energy companies established in 2007
New Zealand companies established in 2007
2012 disestablishments in New Zealand
Energy companies disestablished in 2012
Defunct energy companies of New Zealand